This is a list of episodes from the Turkish TV series, Diriliş: Ertuğrul, created by Mehmet Bozdağ. It premiered in Turkey on TRT 1 on 10 December 2014. Originally 150 episodes, it was later released on Netflix cut into shorter episodes with the number of 448. The show has been well received in Turkey and abroad, particularly in Pakistan and Azerbaijan.

Episodes 
</onlyinclude>

Notes

Season 1 (2014–15)

Süleyman Şah, Bey of the Kayı sends his son, Ertuğrul, to ask for land from the Emir of Aleppo. This is made almost impossible when the Kayı are put in a series of problems with the Templars after saving Şehzade Numan, Halime Sultan, and Şehzade Yiğit because of the traitor in the Emir's palace, Nasir, who works for the Templars but is later killed by Ertuğrul and the truth is shown to the Emir. A problem also arises with Kurdoğlu Bey, Süleyman Şah's adoptive brother, who seeks his brother's Beylik with the help of Selcan Hatun, Ertuğrul's sister-in-law, who wants revenge from Süleyman Şah as he killed her treacherous father, Alptekin Bey. Ertuğrul, who loves Halime, marries her after much difficulty. Selcan's husband, Gündoğdu becomes jealous of his brother Ertuğrul as he is respected as the tribe hero but gradually calms down. Towards the end of the season, Kurdoğlu is beheaded, Ertuğrul successfully defeats the Templars and captures their castle, and Selcan repents. This is followed by Süleyman Şah's death and the tribe's migration to Erzurum as part of Süleyman Şah's will before he died.

Season 2 (2015–16)

The Kayı, settled in Erzurum, seek refuge with the Dodurga after the Mongols, led by Baycu Noyan, massacre half their tribe. This leads to Ertuğrul facing Tuğtekin, his cousin, who is jealous of him along with Gündoğdu again who is misled by the big threat within the Dodurga; Aytolun and her brother Gümüştekin. Aytolun married Tuğtekin's father, Korkut Bey, so that she could help Gümüştekin become the margrave of all the Turkmen tribes with the help of Emir Sadettin after killing Korkut. Only Selcan is aware of this threat and constantly attempts to warn Gündoğdu, who ignores her for her misdeeds in the past. Along with these schemes, Kocabaş, Tuğtekin's alp who works for Baycu Noyan, turns Tuğtekin against Ertuğrul making their relationship worse but is later killed by Ertuğrul, and his relations with Tuğtekin gradually improves. Aytolun and Gümüştekin are killed after their treachery is caught when Selcan's words are listened to and Korkut is killed. Noyan is supposedly killed by Ertuğrul after the death of Tuğtekin and the tribe is split between 1000 migrating to Ahlat with Gündoğdu and 400 migrating to Western Anatolia with Ertuğrul.

Season 3 (2016–17)

The poor Kayı newcomers face Ural of the rich Çavdar trade-veterans. Although Ural isn't the Bey of his tribe, he seeks more and more power, becoming jealous of the Kayı whenever something good happens to the small tribe. Meanwhile, the Templars who have infiltrated Hanlı Pazar, led by Hancı Simon, seek to kill Ertuğrul as he did to the Templars years back. Ertuğrul defeats Hancı Simon and conquers Hanlı Pazar, leaving Ural more jealous than ever. When Ural is accused of killing the Tekfur of Karacahisar, Andros, and causing problems for the Kayı, Ural is sentenced to death, however, he is saved by the devious Emir Sadettin. After the death of Candar, the Çavdar Bey, and Ural's father, Ural seeks help from the new Tekfur of Karacahisar, Vasilius, who wants to rid the Turks of the land, but is killed by Ertuğrul in an attempt to become the Bey of the Çavdar. When Vasilius attempts to ambush the Selçuk Sultan, he fails and is killed by Ertuğrul. Because of this, the Sultan makes Ertuğrul the Uç Bey angering Emir Sadettin, who vows to end Ertuğrul. At the end of the season, Ertuğrul falls into an ambush set by the new Tekfur of Karacahisar, Ares.

Season 4 (2017–18)

It is believed that Ertuğrul is dead despite the truth being that he is actually captured by some slave traders. Meanwhile, Emir Sadettin convinces Dündar, Ertuğrul's brother and the new Kayı Bey, into selling Hanlı Pazar and moving back to Gündoğdu's tribe but is stopped upon Ertuğrul's return and is forthwith banished. After Ertuğrul's son, Gündüz, is kidnapped, Ertuğrul declares war against Karacahisar and is successful in conquering it. Following Ares' capture, Ertuğrul takes him to the Sultan and tells him to confess to the Sultan about Sadettin Köpek's misdeeds. The plan nearly works but Köpek is saved by the Sultan's wife, Mahperi, and leads to an event turning Ares, later killed by Noyan, into a Muslim. Soon after that, the Sultan is killed and Köpek's increase in power in the palace creates problems for the new Sultan, Gıyaseddin. Gıyaseddin allies with Ertuğrul and with the help of Hüsamettin Karaca, Köpek is beheaded. After this, Ertuğrul faces the return of Noyan but is successful in defeating him and his devious sister, Alangoya, who attempted to kill Ertuğrul's son, Osman, who was born on the same day as his mother's death. Noyan prepares for a battle, historically known as the Battle of Köse Dağ and the Kayı move to Söğüt.

Season 5 (2018–19)

After 10 years in Söğüt, in a Mongol-controlled Selçuk state, Ertuğrul faces many Mongol commanders including Alıncak and Subutai, along with the Selçuk assassin working with the Mongols, Beybolat. Beybolat is disguised with the name, Albastı, and he arrives following the death of his father, Umur Bey, Bey of the Umuroğlu tribe, who was sent to become the new tax collecter of Söğüt. Umur Bey was killed by the disgraced Byzantine commander, Dragos, disguised as the Söğüt Zangoç, who seeks to take over the town. Beybolat, who becomes his father's successor, and Dragos, who takes control over Lefke Castle after killing the innocent Tekfur Yannis, cause many problems for Ertuğrul including Beybolat's control over Söğüt for a while. İlbilge, Beybolat's sister, is the only person in her family supporting justice, with her help, Ertuğrul, defeats and kills both Beybolat and Dragos. Following Beybolat's death, Ertuğrul faces Arikbuka, a feared Mongol spy and Alıncak's blood brother, along with the spy, Qiyat, who works for Hulagu against Berke, Ertuğrul's ally and the Han of the Golden Horde. The season ends with the death of Arikbuka and Qiyat along with Ertuğrul's marriage to İlbilge Hatun.

See also
 List of Diriliş: Ertuğrul characters
 List of Kuruluş: Osman episodes
 List of awards and nominations received by Diriliş: Ertuğrul

Notes

References

External links 
List of Diriliş: Ertuğrul episodes at the Internet Movie Database
List of Diriliş: Ertuğrul episodes (season 1) at BeyazPerde.com
List of Diriliş: Ertuğrul episodes (season 2) at BeyazPerde.com
List of Diriliş: Ertuğrul episodes (season 3) at BeyazPerde.com
List of Diriliş: Ertuğrul episodes (season 4) at BeyazPerde.com
List of Diriliş: Ertuğrul episodes (season 5) at BeyazPerde.com

Lists of Turkish drama television series episodes
Diriliş: Ertuğrul and Kuruluş: Osman